is the second major single by the Japanese girl idol group Shiritsu Ebisu Chugaku, released in Japan on August 29, 2012 by Defstar Records.

Release details 
The single was released in three versions: Subculture Edition (Regular Edition), Limited Brasil Edition, and Limited Rock Lee Edition.

The song "Go! Go! Here We Go! Rock Lee" is an ending theme for the new Naruto anime series Rock Lee & His Ninja Pals (from June 2012).

Members 
Shiritsu Ebisu Chugaku: Mizuki, Rika Mayama, Natsu Anno, Ayaka Yasumoto, Aika Hirota, Mirei Hoshina, Hirono Suzuki, Rina Matsuno, Hinata Kashiwagi

Track listing

Limited Brasil Edition

Limited Rock Lee Edition

Subculture Edition (Regular Edition)

Charts

References

External links 
 2nd single "Go! Go! Here We Go! Rock Lee / Otona wa Wakatte Kurenai" out August 29, 2012 - Shiritsu Ebisu Chugaku official site
 Music videos on YouTube (not available outside Japan)
 
 

Shiritsu Ebisu Chugaku songs
2012 singles
Japanese-language songs
Defstar Records singles
Songs written by Kenichi Maeyamada